Ioane Fitu "John" Afoa (born 16 September 1983) is a New Zealand professional rugby union player. His position of choice is at prop. Afoa currently plays for Vannes in France's Pro D2.

Personal life
Afoa was a student at Auckland's Papakura High School, then St. Kentigern College, where he played first XV rugby alongside fellow All Blacks Joe Rokocoko and Jerome Kaino.

Domestic career

New Zealand

Auckland 
Afoa played for Auckland between 2002 and 2011.

Blues 
Afoa played for the Blues and made his debut in 2004 against the Brumbies. He made 101 appearances with the team between 2004 and 2011.

Europe

Ulster 
Afoa played for Ulster in the Pro12 from 2011 until 2014.

Gloucester Rugby 
On 6 December 2013, Afoa officially joined Gloucester Rugby in the English Aviva Premiership on a four-year contract worth £400,000 per season. This made him one of the highest-paid players in the Premiership and the third highest-paid player in European rugby.

Bristol Bears
On 20 January 2018, it was confirmed that Afoa would leave Gloucester to join local rivals Bristol ahead of the 2018-19 season.

Vannes
On 2 May 2022, it was confirmed that Afoa would leave Bristol after four seasons to travel to France to join Pro D2 side Vannes from the 2022-23 season.

International career 
Afoa has moved through a number of international representative sides. In 1999, Afoa made the New Zealand U16 team, the youngest national representative team. Through 2000 and 2001, Afoa had played in the more senior New Zealand Schools' side. Moving steadily through the age grades, he was a member of the New Zealand under-19 teams of 2002 and 2003.

In both 2003 and 2004, Afoa was part of the New Zealand Under 21 Rugby World Championship team. The New Zealanders won the tournament both years. In 2003 Afoa was one of four kiwis named in the IRB's team of the tournament.

In 2005 Afoa was selected for the All Blacks Tri-nations squad. Despite this, he never took the field in that competition and didn't earn his first test cap until the end-of-year tour. In November 2005, Afoa finally became the All Black number 1062 when he started against Ireland at Lansdowne Road.

In 2010, Afoa was experimented to be used at hooker. The same year against Wales, Afoa scored his first test try showing some great running for a prop with a 30-meter dash to the try line.

Afoa's test career ended after the 2011 Rugby World Cup. He played 36 tests, 30 as a substitute.

Coaching career
Afoa was appointed scrum coach at Bristol Bears from the 2021–22 season. He would also continue his playing duties.

References

External links
 

1983 births
Living people
Blues (Super Rugby) players
Auckland rugby union players
Rugby union props
New Zealand international rugby union players
People educated at Saint Kentigern College
Ulster Rugby players
New Zealand sportspeople of Samoan descent
New Zealand rugby union players
New Zealand expatriate rugby union players
New Zealand expatriate sportspeople in England
Expatriate rugby union players in Northern Ireland
Rugby union players from Auckland
People educated at Papakura High School
New Zealand expatriate sportspeople in Northern Ireland
New Zealand expatriate sportspeople in France
Expatriate rugby union players in France
Expatriate rugby union players in England
Rugby Club Vannes players